Borderline Hymns is the debut EP by avant-garde metal band Diablo Swing Orchestra, released in 2003. It consists of four songs, all of which were re-used in their subsequent studio album debut, The Butcher's Ballroom. It is their only record with original singer Lisa Hansson. However, it never released a physical release.

Track listing 
All songs credited to Diablo Swing Orchestra.

Personnel 
 Lisa Hansson – lead vocals
 Daniel Håkansson – guitar
 Pontus Mantefors – guitar, synthesizer, FX
 Anders "Andy" Johansson – bass
 Johannes Bergion – cello, backing vocals
 Andreas Halvardsson – drums

References 

2003 debut EPs
Diablo Swing Orchestra albums
Heavy metal EPs